Port Hood is an unincorporated place in the Municipality of the County of Inverness, Nova Scotia, Canada. It is an administrative centre and a service centre for the surrounding area. It is also the site of a registered historic place, Peter Smyth House.

Port Hood Beach is known for its warm waters and for the nearby Port Hood Station Provincial Park.

History
The Miꞌkmaq called it Kag-weam-kek, meaning sandbar. The first European colonists, the French, called it Juste-au-Corps, meaning waistcoat. The French quarried stone for the Fortress of Louisbourg and built ships at the site. After the English took over Acadia, it was renamed for naval commander Samuel Hood.

Port Hood experienced an economic boom from 1880 to 1910, with coal mining, fishing and marine trade. During the first half of the 1900s, it was served by the Inverness and Richmond Railway. A fire in July 1942 destroyed much of the town's business district.

Geography
It is located on Trunk 19 (the "Ceilidh Trail"), approximately 30-minutes drive north from the Canso Causeway which links Cape Breton Island to the Nova Scotia peninsula.

Climate

Notable people
Al MacInnis: professional ice hockey player who has made generous donations to the local arena, now renamed the Al MacInnis Sports Centre.

References

External links

Communities in Inverness County, Nova Scotia
General Service Areas in Nova Scotia
Populated places in the Municipality of the County of Inverness, Nova Scotia
Populated coastal places in Canada